Stuart Maynard (born 18 October 1980) is an English former footballer and manager. He is currently the manager of Wealdstone, having been promoted from assistant manager in February 2021.

Playing career
Maynard started off his career as an apprentice at Watford, before being released in 1999 after the Hertfordshire based side reached the Premier League. He then went on to have brief spells with FC Groningen and St Albans City, before joining Wealdstone. Maynard made 11 appearances for the Stones, scoring once away to Worthing in December 1999, before returning to St Albans in 2000. Maynard would then go on to spend two years at Aylesbury United, before spending another 9 years in non league football.

Coaching career

Assistant manager
In May 2012, Maynard was appointed as assistant manager at Hemel Hempstead Town, with former teammate Dean Brennan being appointed as manager. The pair guided Hemel to the Southern League title in 2013-14, and to the First Round of the FA Cup the following season, where they lost 3-1 to Bury. Maynard helped the club to reach the National League South playoffs in 2017-18, where they were eliminated on penalties by Braintree Town in the semi final.

On  18 September 2018, Maynard and Brennan were appointed by owner Glenn Tamplin as the managerial team at National League South side Billericay Town. However, they both had their contracts terminated by Tamplin after less than four months in the job on Wednesday 16 January 2019.

On 12 February 2019, the pair joined Isthmian League Premier Division side Kingstonian. However, on 16 March 2019, following a breakdown in relations with a club director over player liaison and team strategy, Maynard and Brennan re-evaluated their position and resigned after just five games in charge.

On 21 May 2019, Maynard and Brennan joined National League South side Wealdstone, with Maynard initially the assistant manager. In the shortened 2019-20 season, the duo led the club to automatic promotion to the National League, as champions of the National League South. On 2 February 2021, Brennan resigned from his role at Wealdstone, with Maynard remaining at the club.

Wealdstone
Following Brennan's departure, Maynard was initially appointed as Wealdstone's interim manager, before being appointed permanently on 11 March 2021, with Matthew Saunders as his assistant manager. The back end of the 2020-21 season saw the club struggle, a number of first team players were furloughed which contributed to Wealdstone suffering multiple heavy defeats at the start of Maynard's tenure. In spite of this, the club still finished in 19th, clear of what would have been the relegation zone.

Maynard's first full season as Wealdstone manager saw the club finish 16th, their highest league finish in 35 years. They finished 19 points clear of the bottom three, in a season which also saw Maynard help Wealdstone to a league double over local rivals Barnet and his former colleague Dean Brennan. On 12 May 2022, Maynard and Saunders were both given two year contract extensions.

Managerial statistics

References

Living people
1980 births
Wealdstone F.C. managers
English footballers
English football managers